Vietnam Railways (VNR) is the state-owned operator of the railway system in Vietnam. The principal route is the  single-track North–South Railway line, running between Hanoi and Ho Chi Minh City. This was built at the metre gauge in the 1880s during the French colonial rule. There are also standard gauge lines running from Hanoi to the People’s Republic of China, eventually leading to Beijing, and some mixed gauge in and around Hanoi.

Problems

While the state of the country’s road network is consistently improving, the railway system makes a significant contribution to the national transport infrastructure, with multiple daily freight trains, many being movement of containers. The 29-34-hour passenger trip between Hanoi and Ho Chi Minh City is very popular both with locals and foreign visitors. Accommodations are: hard seat, soft seat, 4 berth sleeper, and 6 berth sleeper.  Coastal resorts such as Huế, Hội An, and Nha Trang lie along the route and generate considerable tourist traffic. There are no travel restraints in place, and tickets for most trains can be purchased on-line. In the border region, the Sapa line to the north is a very popular tourist attraction, with first class accommodations available. East of Hanoi, the line is dual gauge, with through trains to China available. Visas are required to book cross-border trains. The Ho Chi Minh City–Hanoi line has been rebuilt and upgraded, and damage from war has been repaired.

Projects
There is a long-term plan to build a completely new standard-gauge line to connect the two main cities. New international routes to Phnom Penh and thus via Bangkok to Singapore are also under consideration. A parliamentary resolution of 2005 proposed that foreign investors be invited to invest in Vietnam Railways.
On September 11, 2008, the Cambodian Ministry of Transportation announced a new railway line with the total length of  will connect Phnom Penh with Loc Ninh (Binh Phuoc province), Vietnam. This US$550 million project has been carefully investigated by Chinese experts and is about to be carried out in the near future. Vietnam is extending its network to Loc Ninh. In August 2010, the government announced plans to build two sections of standard-gauge railway, one from Hanoi to Vinh and the other from Ho Chi Minh City to Nha Trang.

Although on the face of things the possibility of a good return might appear small, there are precedents: the lines into China have benefited from Chinese investment and, more recently, Japanese investment was spent on the Hai Van Tunnel project, a new road tunnel alongside the north-south rail line near Da Nang.

At a more local level, the picturesque hill town and resort of Đà Lạt was once connected by a scenic little rack railway to the main north-south line at Thap Cham. Although there is now little visible trace of the trackbed in the green and fertile landscape, local businesses have secured a promise of government funding for its reinstatement, to benefit tourism in the area. Currently, the only railway at Đà Lạt is an  remnant from the old railway connection that runs from Đà Lạt station to the nearby village of Trại Mát. This is run as a tourist attraction.

Other projects likely to receive foreign money are proposed light rail systems within Hanoi.

High-speed rail plans on hold 

It was planned to have an initial travel time of 9 hours and to make a series of improvements over time to eventually reduce the time to 5 hours. The current single track line has journey times from just under thirty hours.

The funding of the $33 billion line was to come mostly from the Vietnamese government, with the help of Japanese aid (on the understanding that Japanese firms would engineer the bulk of the project). In 2010, there was an unsuccessful push to fund the project, and efforts to promote the project have fallen off since then.

The timetable called for the initial construction (the 9-hour line) to be completed in 2016, and the line improvements (the 5-hour line) by 2025. At one point, the Vietnamese prime minister had set a target to complete the line by 2013. Approval was delayed several times, and in May 2010, the plan was finally rejected by the government.

Locomotives

Overview

Routes
 North-South 
 Local
 Hanoi-Beijing

Lines
 Hanoi-Saigon Railway
 Hanoi-Lao Cai Railway
 Hanoi-Quan Trieu Railway
 Hanoi-Dong Dang Railway
 Hanoi-Haiphong Railway
 Kep-Ha Long Railway

Stations
 Saigon station
 Nha Trang station
 Diêu Trì station
Quảng Ngãi station
 Đà Nẵng station
 Huế station
 Đồng Hới station
 Vinh station
 Hải Phòng station
 Hanoi station
 Đồng Đăng station
 Lào Cai station
 Biên Hòa station
 Bồng Sơn station
 Đức Phổ station
 Núi Thành station
 Tam Kỳ station
 Trà Kiệu station
 Tháp Chàm station
 Phan Thiết station

Gauges
 
  (standard gauge)

Trackage
 Total 
  of siding

Rolling stock
 331 diesel locomotives
 34 steam locomotives
 852 coaches
 3922 cars

Hotels
 Hai Can Nam Hotel
 Saigon Railway Hotel
 Kham Thien Hotel
 Mat Son Hotel
 Sam Son Hotel
 Ha Thanh Hotel
 Le Ninh Hotel
 Nha Trang Railway Hotel
 Ca Na Railway Hotel
 Da Lat Railway Hotel
 Ky Dong Hotel
 Hai Van Bac Hotel
 Mua Xuan Hotel

See also

General information
 Rail transport in Vietnam
 Transport in Vietnam
Notable rolling stock
 TY8
 TY6P
 D4H/D4Hr
 China Railways DFH21, known as the D10H in Vietnam.
 D19E diesel locomotive, also known as Đổi mới
Notable Vietnamese rolling stock manufacturers
 Haiphong Carriage Company
 Gia Lam Train Company

Rapid transit projects in Vietnam
 Ho Chi Minh City Metro
 Hanoi Metro 
 Hanoi BRT

Notes

External links

 
 Official booking website
 Ministry of Transport, Vietnam
 Vietnam Railway Authority

Rail transport in Vietnam
Government of Vietnam
Transport companies of Vietnam
Vietnamese brands